First Presbyterian Church, incorporated as the Congregational Society of Brockport, is a historic Presbyterian church located at Brockport in Monroe County, New York. It is a Greek Revival–style edifice built in 1852.  The main block of the building is four bays long and  three bays wide (76 feet by 52 feet), constructed of red brick on a sandstone foundation.  It features a three-stage tower with an octagonal drum from which the spire rises.  The main worship space has a meeting house plan with a three sided upper gallery supported by fluted Doric columns.

It was listed on the National Register of Historic Places in 1999. It is located in the Park Avenue and State Street Historic District.

References

External links
First Presbyterian Church of Brockport NY website

Brockport, New York
Churches on the National Register of Historic Places in New York (state)
Presbyterian churches in New York (state)
Churches completed in 1852
19th-century Presbyterian church buildings in the United States
Churches in Monroe County, New York
National Register of Historic Places in Monroe County, New York
Historic district contributing properties in New York (state)
1852 establishments in New York (state)